Ajātivāda (अजातिवाद) is the fundamental philosophical doctrine of the Advaita Vedanta philosopher Gaudapada. According to Gaudapada, the Absolute is not subject to birth, change and death. The Absolute is aja, the unborn eternal. The empirical world of appearances is considered unreal, and not absolutely existent.

Gaudapada's perspective is based on the Māṇḍūkya Upanishad, applying the philosophical concept of "ajāta" to the inquiry of Brahman, showing that Brahman wholly transcends the conventional understanding of being and becoming. The concept is also found in Madhyamaka Buddhism, as the theory of nonorigination.

Etymology

Ajātivāda:
 "A" means "not", or "non" as in Ahimsa, non-harm
 "Jāti" means "birth," "creation" or "origination; it may refer to physical birth, but also to the arising of mental phenomena
 "Vāda" means "doctrine"

Taken together "ajātivāda" means "the Doctrine of no-origination" or non-creation.

The concept of "ajāta" was borrowed by Gaudapada from Madhyamika Buddhism, which uses the term "anutpāda":
 "An" also means "not", or "non"
 "Utpāda" means "genesis", "coming forth", "birth"

Taken together "anutpāda" means "having no origin", "not coming into existence", "not taking effect", "non-production".

Usage

Gaudapada

"Ajātivāda" is the fundamental philosophical doctrine of Gaudapada. According to Gaudapada, the Absolute is not subject to birth, change and death. The Absolute is aja, the unborn eternal. The empirical world of appearances is considered Maya (unreal as it is transitory), and not absolutely existent.

Gaudapada borrowed the concept of "ajāta" from Nagarjuna's  Madhyamaka philosophy. The Buddhist tradition usually uses the term anutpāda for the absence of an origin or śūnyatā.

Yet, according to Comans, Gaudapada's perspective is quite different from Nagarjuna. Gaudapada's perspective is based on the Māṇḍūkya Upanishad. In the Māṇḍūkya Karika, Gaudapada's commentary on the Māṇḍūkya Upanishad, Gaudapada sets forth his perspective. According to Gaudapada, Brahman cannot undergo alteration, so the phenomenal world cannot arise independently from Brahman. If the world cannot arise, yet is an empirical fact, then the world has to be an unreal (transitory) appearance of Brahman. And if the phenomenal world is a transitory appearance, then there is no real origination or destruction, only apparent origination or destruction. From the level of ultimate truth (paramārthatā) the phenomenal world is māyā, "illusion", apparently existing but ultimately not real.

In Gaudapada-Karika, chapter III, verses 46-48, he states that the quietened mind becomes one with Brahman and does not perceive of any origination:

Acknowledgeing the strong Buddhist influences, but arguing for the need of an "unchangeable permanent reality," Karmakar opinions that the ajātivāda of Gaudhapada has nothing in common with the Sūnyavāda concept in Buddhism. While the language of Gaudapada is undeniably similar to those found in Mahayana Buddhism, Coman states that their perspective is different because unlike Buddhism, Gaudapada is relying on the premise of "Brahman, Atman or Turiya" exists and is the nature of absolute reality.

Ramana Maharshi

Ramana Maharshi gave a translation in Tamil of Gaudapada’s Māṇḍūkya Upanishad Karika, chapter two, verse thirty-two:

According to David Godman, the ajata doctrine implies that since the world was never created, there are also no jivas within it who are striving for or attaining liberation. Ramana Maharshi regarded this as "the ultimate truth."

Levels of truth

Advaita took over from the Madhyamika the idea of levels of reality. Usually two levels are being mentioned, namely saṃvṛti-satya, "the empirical truth", and paramārtha-satya, "ultimate truth". According to Plott, 

The distinction between the two truths (satyadvayavibhāga) was fully expressed by the Madhyamaka-school. In Nāgārjuna's Mūlamadhyamakakārikā it is used to defend the identification of dependent origination (pratītyasamutpāda) with emptiness (śūnyatā):

Shankara uses sublation as the criterion to postulate an ontological hierarchy of three levels:
  (paramartha, absolute), the absolute level, "which is absolutely real and into which both other reality levels can be resolved". This experience can't be sublated by any other experience.
  (vyavahara), or samvriti-saya (empirical or pragmatical), "our world of experience, the phenomenal world that we handle every day when we are awake". It is the level in which both jiva (living creatures or individual souls) and Iswara are true; here, the material world is also true.
  (pratibhasika, apparent reality, unreality), "reality based on imagination alone". It is the level in which appearances are actually false, like the illusion of a snake over a rope, or a dream.

It is at the level of the highest truth (paramārtha) that there is no origination. Gaudapada states that, from the absolute standpoint, not even "non-dual" exists.

Advaita Vedanta and Madhyamaka Buddhism
Many scholars, states Richard King, designate Madhyamaka Buddhism as Ajativada. The concept Ajati, he adds, exists in both Vedanta and Buddhism, but they are different in the following way:

Ajativada in Madhyamaka refers to its doctrine that things neither originate nor is there cessation. This is also called the theory of non-origination of Madhyamaka.

See also
 Anutpada
 Apeiron
 Rigpa
 Dŗg-Dŗśya-Viveka

Notes

References

Sources

Printed sources

Web-sources

External links
 Creation theories in Advaita Vedanta
 Sri Ramana Maharshi website
 Gaudapada on Mandukya Upanishad

Hindu philosophical concepts
Nondualism
Advaita Vedanta